Joshua C. Pierce (December 8, 1830 – June 13, 1904) was an American businessman and politician.

Pierce was born in Nashua, New Hampshire, and attended the Academy of New Hampshire to take a surveying course. He settled in Red Wing, Minnesota, in 1855 with his wife and family. Pierce was involved with the banking and land businesses in Red Wing. A Democrat, Pierce served in the Minnesota House of Representatives in 1872.

References

1830 births
1904 deaths
Politicians from Nashua, New Hampshire
People from Red Wing, Minnesota
Businesspeople from Minnesota
Democratic Party members of the Minnesota House of Representatives